Gerlind Scheller (born 15 October 1967) is a former synchronized swimmer from Germany.

References 

1967 births
Living people
German synchronized swimmers
Olympic synchronized swimmers of West Germany
Synchronized swimmers at the 1984 Summer Olympics
Synchronized swimmers at the 1988 Summer Olympics
Swimmers from Berlin
20th-century German women
21st-century German women